Memadangu is a village in Kerala, India with small mountains, rocky hills, rivers, paddy fields, rubber plantations and pineapple plantations. Memadangu is a natural village with lot of scenic beauties. The village consists mainly of farmers and a few planters. Majority are Hindu and Christian populations. Cultivation consists of rubber plantation, rice and coconut. A rare mix of central travancore culture. The village has a good literacy rate and are continually improving the human potential in the fields of IT, nursing service and other emerging sectors

Churches

There is the Saint Sebastian's church at memadangu and the small church at the arikuzha village center.

Schools

The High is situated in conjunction with the Saint Sebastians Church. Both these schools has big playgrounds which would be busy with plenty of games and funs towards the evening . It is the second home for all the new buds of the village.

Villages in Ernakulam district